is a railway station on the West Japan Railway Company JR Kyoto Line (Tōkaidō Main Line between Kyoto and Osaka) in Ibaraki, Osaka Prefecture, Japan.

History
Ibaraki Station opened on 9 August 1876.

Station numbering was introduced to the station in March 2018 with Ibaraki being assigned station number JR-A41.

Layout
The station has two island platforms, each of which exclusively serves up or down trains.

Adjacent stations

See also
Ibaraki-shi Station (another major station in Ibaraki on the Hankyu Kyoto Main Line)

References

Ibaraki, Osaka
Railway stations in Japan opened in 1876
Railway stations in Osaka Prefecture
Tōkaidō Main Line